Tinerkouk District is a district of Timimoun Province, Algeria.

Communes 
The district is further divided into 2 communes:

 Tinerkouk
 Ksar Kaddour

References 

Districts of Adrar Province